Vega is an unincorporated community in Pike County, in the U.S. state of Georgia.

History
A post office called Vega was established in 1893, and remained in operation until 1907. The community was named after the star Vega.

References

Unincorporated communities in Georgia (U.S. state)
Unincorporated communities in Pike County, Georgia